Idalus fasciipuncta is a moth of the family Erebidae. It was described by Walter Rothschild in 1909. It is found in Brazil and Peru.

References

fasciipuncta
Moths described in 1909